Twenty-One Stories (1954) is a collection of short stories by Graham Greene. All but the last three stories appeared in his earlier 1947 collection Nineteen Stories (one story, "The Other Side Of The Border," was not included in the later collection)

Stories
The collection usually presents the stories in reverse chronological order
"The End of the Party" (1929)
"The Second Death" (1929)
"Proof Positive" (1930)
"I Spy" (1930)
"A Day Saved" (1935)
"Jubilee" (1936)
"Brother" (1936)
"A Chance for Mr Lever" (1936)
"The Basement Room" (1936) (adapted by the author as The Fallen Idol, a film directed by Carol Reed)
"The Innocent" (1937)
"A Drive in the Country" (1937)
"Across the Bridge" (1938) (made into a 1957 film starring Rod Steiger)
"A Little Place off the Edgware Road" (1939)
"The Case for the Defence" (1939)
"Alas, Poor Maling" (1940)
"Men at Work" (1940)
"Greek Meets Greek" (1941)
"The Hint of an Explanation" (1948)
"The Blue Film" (1954)
"Special Duties" (1954)
"The Destructors" (1954)

References

Books by Graham Greene
1954 short story collections
Heinemann (publisher) books
British short story collections